Christian Steiner (born 26 November 1960) is a German ice dancer. He competed in the ice dance event at the 1980 Winter Olympics.

References

External links
 

1960 births
Living people
German male ice dancers
Olympic figure skaters of West Germany
Figure skaters at the 1980 Winter Olympics
Sportspeople from Munich